Belur Assembly constituency is one of the 224 Legislative Assembly constituencies of Karnataka state in India.

It is part of Hassan district.

Members of the Legislative Assembly 
Source:

Election results

2018

See also
 List of constituencies of the Karnataka Legislative Assembly
 Hassan district

References

Hassan district
Assembly constituencies of Karnataka